Niketas of Mistheia was a Byzantine official, originally from Mistheia, and doux of Antioch (1030–1032). He was an eunuch who held the titles of patrikios and rhaiktor.

Career
In 1030, Byzantine Emperor Romanos III Argyros appointed Niketas as katepano of Antioch, following the Battle of Azaz against the Mirdasid dynasty. Later on, he managed to force a coalition of Arab tribes led by Nasr ibn Musharraf al-Rawadifi to withdraw from besieging Maraclea. He then sacked 'Irqa and destroyed the village of Kurin. In December of the same year, the Byzantine generals Niketas of Mistheia and Symeon the protovestiarios besieged and captured Azaz, and burned Tubbal.

In 1031, he took Balatunus from Banu al-Ahmar, some forts from Banu Ghannaj and Ibn al-Kashih, but failed to seize the fortress of Maniqa, as al-Rawadifi managed to burn their siege equipment. However, he re-sacked 'Irqa, taking many prisoners and cattle.

He later organized another campaign to recapture Maniqa from al-Rawadifi. Prior to that, he captured Rafaniyya and destroyed its towers, then managed to free a captured Byzantine Taxiarches in Safita. Afterwards, he controlled Maniqa after a 13-day, in which he also captured Nasr's wife and four daughters, who were abandoned to their fate. On his way back to Antioch, he burned Jaririn.

In 1032, then he secured the region by suppressing a Druze revolt in Mount Summaq, and capturing Bikisrail, despite attempts from the Fatimid commander Anushtakin al-Dizbari to divert the attackers. Eventually, he returned to Constantinople.

References

Sources
 

 
 

11th-century Byzantine people
Byzantine generals
Byzantine governors of Antioch
Byzantine eunuchs